John Don  (10 September 1918 – 1 April 2013) was an Australian politician.

He was born in Ballarat to solicitor Joseph Edwin Don and Mary Minnie Cross. He attended various state schools before studying at Melbourne University. During World War II he served in the Middle East and later the Philippines, attaining the rank of major and being awarded the MBE. On 9 March 1943, he married Joan Yvonne Davies, with whom he had three daughters.

In 1945, Don was elected to the Victorian Legislative Assembly as the Liberal member for Elsternwick, while he was still studying law (he would be admitted as a solicitor in 1954). He was briefly a minister without portfolio in June 1950. A supporter of Thomas Hollway, he was one of the rebels who voted against the McDonald Country Party government in 1952 and served as Minister of Transport and Labour in the seventy-hour ministry that resulted. Expelled from the Liberal Party, he was defeated as an Electoral Reform League candidate in 1955. A solicitor after leaving parliament, he later rejoined the Liberal Party. Don died in 2013.

References

1918 births
2013 deaths
Liberal Party of Australia members of the Parliament of Victoria
Victorian Liberal Party members of the Parliament of Victoria
Members of the Victorian Legislative Assembly
Australian Members of the Order of the British Empire
Australian solicitors
University of Melbourne alumni
Australian Army officers
Australian Army personnel of World War II
People from Ballarat